Morton J. Blumenthal (October 14, 1931 – January 16, 2022) was an American politician.

Blumenthal was born in Putnam, Connecticut, and graduated from Killingly High School. He received his bachelor's degree and law degrees from the University of Connecticut. He served in the United States Air Force. Blumenthal was admitted to the Connecticut bar. He served in the Connecticut House of Representatives, from Danielson, from 1971 to 1975 and was a Republican. He then moved with his family to Manchester, New Hampshire, where he was involved with housing development. He died in Marlboro Township, New Jersey.

References

1931 births
2022 deaths
People from Marlboro Township, New Jersey
People from Putnam, Connecticut
Military personnel from Connecticut
University of Connecticut alumni
Connecticut lawyers
Republican Party members of the Connecticut House of Representatives